Mateo Perillo is an Uruguayan rugby union player, currently playing for Súper Liga Americana de Rugby side Peñarol. His preferred position is prop.

Professional career
Perillo signed for Súper Liga Americana de Rugby side Peñarol ahead of the 2021 Súper Liga Americana de Rugby season. He has also represented the Uruguay national team.

References

External links
itsrugby.co.uk Profile

Living people
Uruguayan rugby union players
Rugby union props
Year of birth missing (living people)
Peñarol Rugby players
Uruguay international rugby union players